Earl of Hertford was launched on the River Thames in 1781. Captain Daniel Clarke sailed from Gravesend on 6 May, bound for India and stopped at Portsmouth on 18 May. She sailed from Portsmouth on 11 June. She stopped at Saint Helena and then arrived at Madras. She foundered at Madras Roads on 15 October 1782 in a monsoon while she lay at anchor.

Earl of Hertford had been carrying cargo destined for China.

Citations and references
Citations

References
 
 

1781 ships
Age of Sail merchant ships of England
Ships of the British East India Company
Maritime incidents in 1782